Nicholas Michel (fl. 1353), was an English Member of Parliament and merchant.

He was a Member (MP) of the Parliament of England for Coventry in 1353. He was Mayor of Coventry on several occasions.

References

Year of birth missing
Year of death missing
English MPs 1353
Members of the Parliament of England for Coventry
Mayors of Coventry